Brignogan-Plages (or simply Brignogan) is a former commune in the Finistère department of Brittany in north-western France. On 1 January 2017, it was merged into the new commune Plounéour-Brignogan-Plages.

Brignogan is 32 kilometres from Brest. Submarine telegraph cables between Cornwall and France came ashore at Brignogan.

Climate
Brignogan-Plages has a oceanic climate (Köppen climate classification Cfb).

Population
Inhabitants of Brignogan-Plages are called Brignoganais in French.

See also
Communes of the Finistère department

References

External links

Former communes of Finistère
Seaside resorts in France